Carole Augusta Shelley (16 August 1939 – 31 August 2018) was an English-American actress who made her career in the United States and United Kingdom. Her many stage roles included Gwendolyn Pigeon in The Odd Couple and Madame Morrible in the original Broadway cast of the musical Wicked. She won the Tony Award for Best Actress in a Play for her performance in The Elephant Man in 1979.

Early life
Shelley was born in London, England, the daughter of Deborah ( Bloomstein), an opera singer of Russian Jewish descent, and Curtis Shelley, a composer of German Jewish origin. Her father had emigrated to London before World War II.

Career

Stage career 
Shelley made her Broadway debut as Gwendolyn Pigeon in the original 1965 production of The Odd Couple (starring Art Carney and Walter Matthau). She reprised the role for the 1968 film version (with Jack Lemmon replacing Carney), and the first season of the subsequent television series (starring Tony Randall and Jack Klugman). She and Monica Evans, who co-starred as her sister Cecily Pigeon, were the only two performers to appear in the original play The Odd Couple and both the film and original television adaptation—and in the same roles.

In the 1970s, Shelley wanted to extend her range, feeling she was not using all her capabilities as an actor. She told The New York Times in a 1979 interview that she had "months of the most intensive deep-water swimming — more than I’d ever been called upon to do in my life" when she played Rosalind in As You Like It at the 1972 Stratford Festival in Ontario. She received her first Tony Award nomination in 1975 for her performance as "Jane" in Absurd Person Singular. Shelley won the 1979 Tony Award for Best Actress in a Play for her role as Mrs. Kendal in The Elephant Man, and was nominated for the Tony Award as Featured Actress in a Play in 1987 for her performance in Stepping Out as "Maxine". In 1982 she won an Obie Award for her performance Twelve Dreams. Shelley also began appearing in musicals in the late 1990s, with the revivals of Show Boat as Parthy and Cabaret as Fraulein Schneider in 1999.

In 2003, Shelley created the role of Madame Morrible in the original Broadway cast of the musical Wicked, a role which she later reprised in the show's national touring company in 2005 and in 2006 in the Chicago production.

Shelley played the role of Grandma in the Broadway production of Billy Elliot at the Imperial Theatre, beginning performances in October 2008. She was nominated for a Tony Award for Best Featured Actress in a Musical in 2009. In 2014, she succeeded Jane Carr as Miss Shingle in A Gentleman's Guide to Love and Murder.

Film and television career 
Shelley's early career included roles in British films such as It's Great to Be Young (1956), Carry On Regardless (1961), No My Darling Daughter (1961), The Cool Mikado (1962) and Carry On Cabby (1963). In 1968 Shelley starred as Gwendolyn Pigeon in the film The Odd Couple. Thereafter she took on numerous roles in television and films such as The Boston Strangler (1968), Some Kind of a Nut (1969), The Whoopee Boys (1986), Little Noises (1992), The Road to Wellville (1994), and she played Helen Moskowitz in the Emmy-winning 1998 Frasier episode "Merry Christmas, Mrs. Moskowitz".

She was featured as "Aunt Clara" alongside Nicole Kidman and former Wicked co-star Kristin Chenoweth in the 2005 film Bewitched.<ref>[https://web.archive.org/web/20131019221805/http://movies.nytimes.com/movie/295630/Bewitched/cast Bewiched' Cast] The New York Times. Retrieved 5 April 2013</ref> She lent her voice to several roles in Disney animated films; notably, Amelia Gabble (the Goose) in The Aristocats (1970), Lady Kluck, Maid Marian's sidekick and lady-in-waiting, in Robin Hood (1973), and Lachesis the Fate in Hercules. Shelley's "sister" co-star in all three versions of The Odd Couple, Monica Evans, also played her "goose" sister in The Aristocats, Abigail Gabble, and Maid Marian in Robin Hood as a nod to their roles as Pigeon Sisters.

Her final role was a cameo at the beginning of John Mulaney’s 2018 comedy special Kid Gorgeous''; she played Mulaney’s guide around Radio City Music Hall.

Personal life
In 1967, she was married to Albert G. Woods, who died in 1971.

Death
Shelley died of cancer on August 31, 2018, at the age of 79 in New York City.

Filmography

Film

Television

References

External links
 
 
 

1939 births
2018 deaths
American film actresses
American people of German-Jewish descent
American people of Russian-Jewish descent
American musical theatre actresses
American stage actresses
American television actresses
American voice actresses
English film actresses
English Jews
English musical theatre actresses
English stage actresses
English television actresses
English voice actresses
Deaths from cancer in New York (state)
People with acquired American citizenship
Drama Desk Award winners
Tony Award winners
English expatriates in the United States
Actresses from London
People educated at St Mary's Town and Country School
Jewish British actresses
20th-century English actresses
21st-century English actresses
20th-century British businesspeople
21st-century American women